Anja Štefan is a Slovene writer, poet and story teller.

Biography 

Anja Štefan was born on 2 April 1969 in Šempeter pri Gorici. She studied Slovene and English at the University of Ljubljana and graduated in 1994. After graduation she continued with studies in the field of folkloristics and she obtained her master's degree in 1999.

She works as a free-lance writer. She is one of the few Slovenian professional storytellers and the initiator of The Slovenian Storytelling Festival, started in 1998. She explores the Slovenian narrative tradition. As a poet and writer she writes mostly for children; she also retells Slovenian folk and fairytales and translates folk stories from other languages. In 1993 she began to cooperate with Ciciban and in 1998 with Cicido, the two Slovenian major magazines for children. She has received numerous awards for literary work. She won the Levstik Award twice, in 2001 Melje, melje, mlinček (Grind, Grind, Grinder) and in 2007 for Kotiček na koncu sveta (A Corner at the End of the World).

Bibliography

Picture books 

 Lonček na pike (A Pot for Points), 2008
 Štiri črne mravljice (Four Black Ants), 2007
 Sto ugank (AHundred Riddles), 2006
 Iščemo hišico (Looking for a Little House), 2005
 Kotiček na koncu sveta, (A Corner at the End of the World), 2005 
 Bobek in barčica (Bobby and the Boat), 2005
 Lešniki, lešniki (Hazelnuts, hazelnuts), 2000 
 Melje, melje mlinček (Grind, Grind, Grinder), 1999
 Čmrlj in piščalka (The Bumblebee and the Whistle), 1998

Folk literature 

 Za devetimi gorami (Beyond Nine Mountains), 2011 
 Trije prašički: angleška ljudska pravljica (The Three Little Pigs: An English Folk Tale), 2008
 Zajec in lisica: slovenske basni (The Rabbit and the Fox: Slovene Fables), 2004
 Čudežni mlinček: ljudske pripovedi s celega sveta (The Enchanted Mill: Folk Tales from Around the World), 2002
 O pastirčku in debeli uši: slovenska ljudska pravljica (About the Little Shepherd Boy and the Fat Louse: A Slovene Folk Tale), 2000
 Zlato kralja Matjaža: slovenska ljudska pravljica (King Matjaž's Gold: A Slovene Folk Tale), 1999
 O Pustu in zakletem gradu: slovenska ljudska pravljica (The Story of Pust and the Cursed Castle: A Slovene Folk Tale), 1999
 Čez griček v gozdiček (Over the Hill Into the Woods), 1995

Awards 

 Levstik Award (2001) – Melje, melje mlinček
 Growing With Books Awards (2006) – Bobek in barčica
 Best Original Slovene Picture Book Award (2007) – Sto ugank
 Levstik Award (2007) – Kotiček na koncu sveta
 Ljubljana Reads Award (2008) – Sto ugank
 Ljubljana Reads Award (2010) – Lonček na pike

References

 Anja Štefan: »Kot pripovedovalka sem bolj zares z ljudmi.« Article in Delo, 20 March 2011
 Anja Štefan on the Mladinska Knjiga Publishing House site

External links
 Ljubljana Puppet Theatre performance of Anja Štefan's Bobek in barčica (Bobby and the Boat)

Slovenian women poets
Slovenian poets
1969 births
Living people
Slovenian children's writers
Levstik Award laureates
Slovenian women children's writers
Fabulists
Women storytellers
Slovenian storytellers
People from Šempeter pri Gorici